Robert C. Nairne (born March 24, 1954) is a former American football linebacker who played for seven seasons in the National Football League from 1977 to 1983.  He played for Oregon State University in college.

General references
Rob Nairne Past Stats, Statistics, History, and Awards - databaseFootball.com

1954 births
American football linebackers
Living people
Denver Broncos players
New Orleans Saints players
Oregon State Beavers football players
People from Redding, California
People from Ferndale, California